Naukova Dumka ( — literally "scientific thought") is a publishing house in Kyiv, Ukraine.

It was established by the National Academy of Sciences of Ukraine in 1922, largely owing to the efforts of Ahatanhel Krymsky, a prominent Ukrainian linguist and orientalist. It is one of the oldest scientific and academic publishing houses in the former Soviet Union and became known as Naukova Dumka in 1964, before which it simply functioned as the official publisher of the National Academy of Sciences of Ukraine.
It continues its operations in Ukraine, publishing primarily scientific and historical works as well as dictionaries.

See also
List of publishing companies of Ukraine

References 
 History of Naukova Dumka 
 History of Naukova Dumka, website of the National Academy of Sciences of Ukraine

External links 
 Naukova Dumka website

References 

Publishing companies of the Soviet Union
1922 establishments in Ukraine
Publishing companies established in 1922
National Academy of Sciences of Ukraine
Publishing companies of Ukraine
Academic publishing companies